Raymond Berriman Rowe (27 November 1883 – 20 October 1958) was an Australian rules footballer who played with St Kilda in the Victorian Football League (VFL).

Notes

External links 

1883 births
1958 deaths
Australian rules footballers from Victoria (Australia)
St Kilda Football Club players